Jimmy Ray Bennett (born June 26) is an American actor. He is best known as the voice of Floyd Hebert in the 2013 video game Grand Theft Auto V and in television for the roles of Nathan Brooks in the Amazon Studios drama Hand of God and as the "White DL" in the Peabody Award-winning documentary DL Hughley: The Endangered List on Comedy Central.

Early life
Bennett was born in Tallahassee, Florida to Jim and Janie Bennett, who have since divorced. He has two sisters. He graduated high school from the Florida State University School and earned his B.F.A in Musical Theatre from Florida State University in 1998.

Career
After moving to New York City, Bennett co-created the improvised musical The Nuclear Family with Stephen Guarino and John Gregorio. The show was considered a cult hit downtown and moved Off-Broadway in 2003 to the Zipper Theatre and subsequently to Barrow Street Theatre. The show was adapted for television the following year for the Sundance TV LAB. He has also improvised with Dad's garage in Atlanta and at The Groundlings in Los Angeles. In 2006, he won the World Domination Improv Tournament in Atlanta, along with The Nuclear Family.

In video games, he is the voice of Floyd Hebert in Grand Theft Auto V, of which he also provides the likeness and motion capture for the character. Released in 2013, GTA V is the largest grossing video game launch in history, having made over $800 million within the first 24 hours of release. He also voiced numerous characters in Red Dead Redemption. Both were produced by Rockstar Games.

Theatrically, he played Sohovik in Damn Yankees at City Center Encores Summer Stars and was also the understudy for Sean Hayes. In 2008 he performed at The Kennedy Center in the cast of Broadway: Three Generations which opened the newly renovated Eisenhower Theater. Bennett was a member of the original productions of Illyria for Prospect Theatre Company and White's Lies at New World Stages with Betty Buckley. He was in the New York premier cast of Around The World In 80 Days in 2013, Off-Broadway. Bennett also participated in the 75th Sondheim! Birthday Concert with the NY Philharmonic at Lincoln Center. He can be heard on the Cast Recording for The York Theatre Company's SUNDOWN as Morgan Earp, as well as Vincent Youmans' THROUGH THE YEARS and Kay Swift's FINE AND DANDY. Both produced by PS Classics.

Bennett was part of the 2013 CBS diversity showcase which took him to Los Angeles. He has been seen in Hot In Cleveland on TV Land. He was the neighbor in the Qu'osby Show parody on The Daily Show with Jon Stewart and in 2012, he was in the Peabody Award winning documentary DL Hugely: The Endangered List. He played tech billionaire Nathan Brooks on the Amazon Studios original drama Hand Of God.

Bennett recently completed the Fuse production of The Last Breakfast Club at Rockwell Table and Stage in Los Angeles. Directed by Bradley Bredeweg and co-starring Garrett Clayton and Max Ehrich.

Bennett resides in New York City.

Filmography

Film

Television

Video games

References

External links
 

Year of birth missing (living people)
Living people
American male television actors
American male voice actors
People from Tallahassee, Florida